"Rough with the Smooth" is a 1995 song by British singer Shara Nelson, released as the first single from her second solo album, Friendly Fire. It peaked at number 30 on the UK Singles Chart.

Critical reception
Pan-European magazine Music & Media wrote, "Many so-called "dance divas" pretend they can sing; Shara is for real. Mixing her smooth vocals with the fairly rough
backing, composition and arrangement are almost restyled Bacharach/David."

Track listing
 UK CD Single #7243 8 82424 2 4
 "Rough with the Smooth" (7" Edit) 3:51
 "Rough with the Smooth" (Street Level Mix) 4:48
 "Rough with the Smooth" (Extended Album Mix) 5:26
 "Rough with the Smooth" (Long Island Expressway Mix) 8:22
 "Rough with the Smooth" (Franktified Dub) 7:54
 "Rough with the Smooth" (Saturday Night At The Glasshouse Mix) 4:56

Charts

References

External links

1995 singles
Shara Nelson songs
1995 songs
Cooltempo Records singles
Songs written by Shara Nelson